Cross Plains Independent School District is a public school district based in Cross Plains, Texas (USA).  Located in Callahan County, portions of the district extend into Eastland, Brown, and Coleman counties.  In 2009, the school district was rated "recognized" by the Texas Education Agency.

Cross Plains ISD has two campuses -

Cross Plains High School (Grades 7–12) 
Cross Plains Elementary (Grades PK-6)

References

External links
Cross Plains ISD
Cross Plains Exes website

School districts in Callahan County, Texas
School districts in Eastland County, Texas
School districts in Coleman County, Texas
School districts in Brown County, Texas